Alvin Leon Williams Jr. (born August 6, 1974) is an American retired professional basketball player who played for Villanova University and in the National Basketball Association (NBA) from 1997 to 2007.

College career
Williams graduated from Germantown Academy in 1993 where he was in the same graduating class as Bradley Cooper.  He then went to Villanova as one of the most highly touted recruits sounding a charge led by head coach Steve Lappas to restart bringing homegrown talent from Philadelphia to the Wildcats, which had been dormant for years under head coach Rollie Massimino. During his senior season, Williams led Villanova in scoring and assists with 17 points and 4.5 assists per game. Along with Tim Thomas, Williams would take Villanova to a regular season Big East title and a berth in the 1997 NCAA tournament where they lost in the Second round to California featuring future NFL All-Pro Tony Gonzalez.

Professional career

Toronto Raptors
After being drafted by the Portland Trail Blazers in the second round of the 1997 NBA draft, Williams was traded to the Toronto Raptors in February 1998.

Williams worked his way into the Raptors' rotation under head coach Butch Carter, but greatly improved as the starting point guard under head coach Lenny Wilkens in 2001. He started all 82 games for two straight seasons in 2001–02 and 2002–03. During the 2002–03 season, which was his best statistical season as a professional, Williams averaged 13.2 points and 5.3 assists per game. After missing a third of the 2003–04 and the entire 2004–05 season with a knee injury, Williams rejoined the lineup at the start of the 2005–06 season. Unfortunately, the injured knee forced Williams back on the injured list after playing just one game that season.

On July 26, 2006, Williams was waived by the Raptors to make room for free agent guard Fred Jones. Reports said both the team and Williams had reached an agreement that resulted in the Raptors only having to pay half of Williams's remaining salary.

Los Angeles Clippers
On January 20, 2007, Williams signed a 10-day contract with the Los Angeles Clippers. He was not signed to a second contract after the first expired after appearing in two games in limited action.

Post-playing career
On July 1, 2009, the Raptors announced the hiring of Williams as an assistant coach for the team. This would mark the return of Williams to the organization since being waived by the team less than three years earlier.

On September 24, 2010, the Raptors announced that Williams would become the team's Director of Player Development.

In June 2013 he was let go from his position with the Raptors.

Since 2015 Williams has been an NBA Analyst with Rogers Sportsnet.

In September 2021, Rogers Sportsnet and the Toronto Raptors announced that Williams would take over the colour commentary duties on all Rogers Sportsnet broadcasts of Raptors games, replacing Leo Rautins on that network.

See also
 Toronto Raptors accomplishments and records

Notes

External links
 
 
 Career statistics at ESPN.com
 College statistics at Sports-Reference.com

1974 births
Living people
African-American basketball coaches
African-American basketball players
American expatriate basketball people in Canada
American men's basketball players
Basketball coaches from Pennsylvania
Basketball players from Philadelphia
Boston Celtics assistant coaches
Germantown Academy alumni
Los Angeles Clippers players
Point guards
Portland Trail Blazers draft picks
Portland Trail Blazers players
Toronto Raptors assistant coaches
Toronto Raptors players
Villanova Wildcats men's basketball players
21st-century African-American sportspeople
20th-century African-American sportspeople
Sportspeople from Philadelphia